Beech Island is an unincorporated community and census-designated place (CDP) in Aiken County, South Carolina, United States.  It was first listed as a CDP in the 2020 census with a population of 1,421.

History
According to tradition, the community was first named "Beech Highland" on account of its lofty elevation, and over time the H was dropped, causing the present name to be adopted.

Beech Island was primarily an agricultural community before the 1950s. Cotton, wheat, corn, and soybean were the major crops. This changed with the construction of Urquhart Station Power Station and the nearby Savannah River Nuclear Project. New highways were built to accommodate the workers commuting to the Nuclear Project. Commerce grew and the community began to change. In the 1960s Kimberly-Clark built a large manufacturing facility on what was once farmland, creating more jobs. The boom, however, was short-lived.

Beech Island's most famous resident was James Brown, who lived there for the last few decades of his life on a  estate. Brown is buried in the Thomas Family Home Crypt on Beech Island.

The Cedars, Fort Moore-Savano Town Site, Redcliffe Plantation State Historic Site, Oakland Plantation, and Zubly Cemetery are listed on the National Register of Historic Places.

Beech Island is also home to most of the television transmitters that serve the Augusta, GA MSA.

Demographics

2020 census

Note: the US Census treats Hispanic/Latino as an ethnic category. This table excludes Latinos from the racial categories and assigns them to a separate category. Hispanics/Latinos can be of any race.

See also
Beech Island Historical Society
  - the island in Georgia
  - the community in South Carolina

References

Unincorporated communities in South Carolina
Unincorporated communities in Aiken County, South Carolina
Census-designated places in South Carolina
Census-designated places in Aiken County, South Carolina
Augusta metropolitan area